Shekha Bird Sanctuary is a bird sanctuary at a  lake near the village of Shekha,  east of Aligarh and  from the Grand Trunk Road (GT Road) in the state of Uttar Pradesh, India. It is notable for birding as many birds overwinter there.

It is a fresh water perennial water body that came into existence after the formation of the Upper Ganges Canal in 1852 which flows adjacent to the lake. It is maintained by the Forest Department.

The best time to visit is between November and February. Starting January 2015, there is a cost of ₹10 for visitors.

List of birds
 Black-necked stork
 White ibis
 Spoonbill
 Greylag goose
 Bar-headed goose
 Lesser whistling teal
 Ruddy shelduck
 Northern pintail
 Common teal
 Indian spot-billed duck
 Sarus crane
 Asian openbill stork
 Red-breasted flycatcher
 Black- necked stork
 Wooly-necked stork
 Common Pochard
 Ferruginous Duck
 Ferruginous Duck
 Baer's Pochard
 Tufted Duck
 Indian Peafowl
 Common Quail
 Black Francolin
 Gray Francolin
 Little Grebe
 Asian Openbill
 Woolly-necked Stork
 Black-necked Stork
 Little Cormorant
 Great Cormorant
 Purple Heron
 Cattle Egret
 Indian Pond-Heron
 Black-headed Ibis
 Red-naped Ibis
 Eurasian Spoonbill
 Black-shouldered Kite
 Egyptian Vulture
 Booted Eagle
 Bonelli's Eagle
 Shikra
 Black Kite
 Egyptian vulture

Gallery

See also
Keetham Lake

References
Official Website Of Uttar Pradesh State Tourism Development Corporation Ltd
Patna Bird Sanctuary
Sheikha Jheel case study - Kalpavriksh
India Nature Watch

Aligarh district
Lakes of Uttar Pradesh
Bird sanctuaries of Uttar Pradesh
2009 establishments in Uttar Pradesh